Claire Deleurme is a French glass artist. Her work is held in the permanent collection of the Corning Museum of Glass.

Biography
Deleurme completed a National College Diploma in Visual Arts from École Supérieure des Beaux-arts de Cornouaille, France, and a European Glass Fellows Diploma with honors from Centre Européen de Recherches et Formation aux Arts Verriers, Vannes-le-Châtel, France. In 2016, she held a residency at the Corning Museum of Glass in the United States.

References

External links
 Deleurme website

Living people
French glass artists
21st-century French women artists
Year of birth missing (living people)